Monster High is a 1989 comedy horror film directed by Rudy Poe

Plot
When aliens bring a stolen doomsday device to Earth, it is up to a group of high school students to save the world.

Reception
Reviews for the film are uniformly bad. DVD Talk said "it's really tough to be entertained by anything this inane, chintzy, and uninspired." The Horror Movie Survival Guide describes the film as "Kind of like Michael Jordan's Space Jam but much much worse."

Home media
Monster High was released on DVD by Sony Pictures Home Entertainment as the "4 Movie Thrills & Chills Collection, Volume 3" along with The Craft, Fright Night, and Brainscan.

References

External links

1989 films
1989 horror films
American comedy horror films
American teen horror films
1980s comedy horror films
1989 comedy films
1980s English-language films
1980s American films